Veryan Bay along the southern coast of Cornwall, England, is a curving, natural bay
that stretches for 4.6 miles in width and recedes by up to 1.5 miles. It lies between the
Peneare Head to the west and Dodman Point at the east. The shoreline varies in height from
20 to 200 feet, with indentations forming bights.
Along the bay is Porthluney Cove, which is overlooked by Caerhays Castle.

See also

HMS Veryan Bay (K651)

References

Bays of Cornwall